Je'lon Hornbeak (born May 1, 1994) is an American professional basketball player who most recently played for the Fort Wayne Mad Ants of the NBA G League. He played college basketball for Oklahoma and Monmouth.

College career
Hornbeak was a four-star recruit out of Grace Prep and committed to Oklahoma. He played two seasons for the Sooners and was a part of two NCAA Tournament teams. Hornbeak averaged 5.1 points and 2.6 assists as a sophomore coming off the bench after starting most of his freshman year. After his sophomore season he transferred to Monmouth and sat out a season per NCAA regulations, undergoing surgery on his right foot in October 2014. On December 15, 2015 Hornbeak scored a season-high 18 points in an 83–68 upset of Georgetown. He was indefinitely suspended by coach King Rice for conduct detrimental to the team on January 2, 2016. Hornbeak returned to the lineup on January 12. He helped fill in for Deon Jones, who missed five games with a hand injury.  Hornbeak averaged 8.9 points per game as a redshirt junior, helping the team to a 28–8 record and NIT berth. As a senior, Hornbeak averaged 11.9 points, 4.3 rebounds, 1.8 assists and 1.5 steals per game.

Professional career
After going undrafted in the 2017 NBA draft, Hornbeak attended an open tryout for the Fort Wayne Mad Ants of the NBA G League in September and made the team. He scored 18 points in a 104–77 victory over Raptors 905 in November. On February 14, 2019, Hornbeak was suspended five games for violating the league's anti-drug policy.

References

External links
 Monmouth Hawks bio

1994 births
Living people
American men's basketball players
Basketball players from Texas
Fort Wayne Mad Ants players
Monmouth Hawks men's basketball players
Oklahoma Sooners men's basketball players
Shooting guards
Sportspeople from Arlington, Texas